The Helpmann Award for Best Play is a theatre award, presented by Live Performance Australia (LPA) at the annual Helpmann Awards since 2001.  The award is for a production of a play, which may be a new work or a revival of an existing work. This is a list of winners and nominations for the Helpmann Award for Best Play.

Winners and nominees

Source:

2000s

2010s

See also
Helpmann Awards

References

External links
The official Helpmann Awards website

P